Radical 92 or radical fang meaning "tooth" or "fang" is one of the 34 Kangxi radicals (214 radicals total) composed of 4 strokes.

In the Kangxi Dictionary, there are nine characters (out of 49,030) to be found under this radical.

 is also the 69th indexing component in the Table of Indexing Chinese Character Components predominantly adopted by Simplified Chinese dictionaries published in mainland China.

Evolution

Derived characters

Literature

External links

Unihan Database - U+7259

092
069